Connaught Hall may refer to one of two university halls of residence:

 Connaught Hall, London — a University of London intercollegiate hall of residence in Tavistock Square, London WC1
 Connaught Hall, Southampton — owned by University of Southampton

Architectural disambiguation pages